The Frying Pan Ranch is a historic ranch in Potter County, Texas. Tecovas Creek, a tributary of the Canadian River, flows through the ranch.

History
The ranch was established in 1881 by Henry B. Sanborn and William Henry Bush, two employees of Joseph Glidden, the inventor of barbed wire.

References

Ranches in Texas
1881 establishments in Texas
Companies established in 1881
Agriculture companies of the United States 
American companies established in 1881
Agriculture companies established in the 19th century